"Haru wa Doko kara kuru no ka?" (春はどこから来るのか？) is the third single by Japanese idol girl group NGT48. It was released on April 11, 2018. It was number-one on the Oricon Singles Chart and was also number-one on the Billboard Japan Hot 100.

Track listing

Type A

Charts

Weekly charts

References

NGT48 songs
2018 songs
2018 singles
Oricon Weekly number-one singles
Billboard Japan Hot 100 number-one singles
Song articles with missing songwriters